Ejipura is a locality located in the southern part of the city of Bangalore. Ejipura is in close proximity to Koramangala, Embassy GolfLinks Business Park and National Games Village.

The locality is known for its traffic congestion, narrow lanes, unsafe buildings, water logging, overflowing drains, and roads ridden by potholes and garbage dumpings.

In 2013, over 5000 people were evicted from housing in the area to clear space for a shopping mall. In October 2017, a two-story building collapsed in the area causing seven deaths and injuries to seven others.

References

Neighbourhoods in Bangalore